Enrique Tagle Lozada, also known as Kuya Ike, or Iking (July 5, 1943 – March 8, 1995) was a Filipino actor, comedian, and television host.

Early life
Lozada was born on July 7, 1943, in Iloilo City. He was 2nd of brood of 4, he is the son of the late Jose Lozada, Sr. He started acting at the age of 11 on the movie Mga Bituin ng Kinabukasan with the younger Susan Roces.

Death
He died on March 8, 1995, in Manila of a heart attack at the Quezon City Medical Center. He was 51. His remains were laid to rest at the Manila Memorial Park in Parañaque.

Filmography

Film

Tawag ng Tanghalan (1958)
Strangers in the Night (1966)
Langit Pa Rin Kita (1967)
Sons of the Lo' Waist Gang (1967)
Bertang Palengke (1967)
Shing-A-Ling-A-Loo, Pretty Girl (1967)
Somebody Cares (1967)
Way Out in the Country (1967)
Top Ten (1967)
Goin' to A-Go-Go (1967)
Shake-a-Boom! (Naghalo ang Balat sa Tinalupan) (1967)
Mash K' Pops (1967)
Sitting in the Park (1967)
Let's Do the Psychedelic '68 (1967)
The More I See You (1968)
Talents Unlimited (1968)
Summer Love (1968)
Sideshow '69 (1968)
Kailanma'y di ka Mag-iisa (1968)
Boogaloo (1968)
Bakit Kita Inibig? (1968)
Bahay Kubo, Kahit Munti (1968)
Arista ang aking Asawa (1968)
Young Girl (1969)
Teenage Escapades! (1969)
Pa-Bandying-Bandying (1969)
Our Man Duling (1969)
Oh, Delilah (1969)
Karate Showdown (1969)
Halina Neneng Ko (1969)
Fiesta Extravaganza (1969)
Drakulita (1969)
Cuatro Vendetta (1969)
Banda 24 (1969)
Ang Kawatan (1969)
9 Teeners (1969)
Tisoy (1969)
D' Musical Teenage Idols! (1969)
Young Love (1970)
Three for the Road (1970)
Pen-Pen (1970)
Orang (1970)
I Dream of Nora (1970)
Haydee (1970)
Happy Hippie Holiday (1970)
Your Love (1970)
The Young at Heart (1970)
Nora in Wonderland (1970)
Hey There, Lonely Girl (1970)
The Sensations (1971)
Sweet Caroline (1971)
Make Laugh, Not War (1971)
Guy and Pip (1971)
Fiesta Extravaganza '71 (1971)
Jesus Christ Superstar (1972)
Oh Margie Oh (1974)
Memories of Our Love (1975)
Relaks Lang Mama, Sagot Kita (1976)
Mr. Wong and the Bionic Girls (1977)
Wonder Dabiana (1978)
Gorgonya (1978) (as Bekya)
Sabi Barok Lab Ko Dabiana (1978)
Tomcat (1979)
They Call Him Bruce Lee (1979)
Tatay na Barok (1979)
Isa, Dalawa, Tatlo, Ang Tatay Kong Kalbo (1979)
Anak ng Atsay (1979)
Roberta (1979)
High School Circa '65 (1979)
Sunnyboy und Sugarbaby (1979)
Si Gorio at ang Damong Ligaw (1979)
Max en Jess (1979)
Six Million Centavo Man (1980)
Reyna ng Pitong Gatang (1980)
Pompa (1980)
Juan Tamad Junior (1980)
Hepe (1980)
Kape't Gatas (1980)
Rocky Tu-log (1981)
Ibalik ang Swerti (1981)
Burgis (1981)
Palengke Queen (1982)
D'Wild Wild Weng (1982)
Tatlo Silang Tatay Ko (1982)
Give Me Five! (1984) (as Facundo)
Anak ni Waray vs Anak ni Biday (1984)
Charot (1984)
I Won, I Won (Ang S'werte Nga Naman) (1985)
Bakit Naglaho ang Magdamag? (1986)
Mga Lahing Pikutin (1987) 
Family Tree (1987)
Pardina at ang Mga Duwende (1989) (as Celestino)
Working Students (1990)
Ano Ba 'Yan (1992) (as Fonso)
Ano Ba 'Yan 2 (1993) (as Fonso)

Television
Big Ike's Happening (BBC, 1973–1984)
GMA Supershow (GMA Network, 1983–1986)
Talents Unlimited (ABS-CBN, 1986–1987)
That's Entertainment (GMA Network, 1986–1995)
Good Morning Showbiz (GMA Network, 1988–1989)
A Star Is Born (IBC, 1992–1993)

References

External links

1943 births
1995 deaths
20th-century comedians
20th-century Filipino male actors
ABS-CBN personalities
Burials at the Manila Memorial Park – Sucat
Filipino male comedians
Filipino people of Spanish descent
Filipino television personalities
Filipino television variety show hosts
GMA Network personalities
Male actors from Iloilo
People from Iloilo City
That's Entertainment (Philippine TV series)
Visayan people